Leslie Thomas Boyne (30 August 1899 – 26 March 1980) was an Australian rules footballer who played with Fitzroy in the Victorian Football League (VFL).

Notes

External links 

1899 births
1980 deaths
Australian rules footballers from Melbourne
Fitzroy Football Club players
People from Carlton, Victoria